Cochylimorpha yangtseana is a species of moth of the family Tortricidae. It is found in Xizang, China.

The wingspan is about 18 mm. The forewings are white, with markings similar to those of Cochylimorpha hedemanniana. They are yellow-brown, but browner at the costa and dorsum. The hindwings are pale brownish grey.

References

 

Y
Endemic fauna of China
Moths of Asia
Moths described in 2006
Taxa named by Józef Razowski